Ginihila is a 2003 Maldivian horror film directed by Easa Shareef. Produced under EMA Productions, the film stars Ali Seezan, Mariyam Nisha, Reeko Moosa Manik and Niuma Mohamed in pivotal roles. The film is an unofficial remake of Vikram Bhatt's Indian horror film Raaz (2002) which itself is an unofficial adaptation of What Lies Beneath.

Cast 
 Ali Seezan as Mifzal Amir
 Mariyam Nisha as Sajuna
 Reeko Moosa Manik as Hakeem
 Niuma Mohamed as Suhana
 Sheereen Abdul Wahid as Zeyba
 Aishath Gulfa as Sweydha
 Ibrahim Wisan as Mifzal's friend
 Koyya Hassan Manik as Ibrahim Rafeeu

Soundtrack

Accolades

References

2003 films
2003 horror films
Remakes of Maldivian films
Maldivian horror films
Films directed by Easa Shareef